Nyima may refer to:

Nyima County, a county in Tibet
Nyima (Baingoin), a township in Tibet
Nyima (village), a village in Tibet
Nyima (Africa), a West-African community
Nyima language, a language of Nigeria
Nyima languages, a pair of languages of Sudan

People with the name 
Gedhun Choekyi Nyima (born 1989), claimant to the title of the 11th Panchen Lama
Lodrö Chökyi Nyima (born 1995), recognized as the 4th reincarnation of the Jamgon Kongtrul
Chime Tenpai Nyima, a Tibetan Buddhist master